Sáenz Peña is a town in Tres de Febrero Partido of Buenos Aires Province, Argentina. It is located in the Greater Buenos Aires urban agglomeration on the border with Buenos Aires.

History
The first recorded owner of the territory was in 1615, since then it changed ownership many times. In 1850 it was acquired by Manuel Lynch. After his death the land was sold and then divided into lots, this was the impetus which led to the urbanisation of the area. In the early 20th century a railway station was authorised and named after the recently deceased President Luis Sáenz Peña. The station was officially opened on 1 November 1910.

The area quickly grew in importance, in 1912 the area was electrified, in 1920 the first police station and in 1927 the first telephone lines.

Famous residents
 Marco Denevi, writer and dramatist.
 Jonás Gutiérrez, footballer.
 Guido Rodríguez, footballer.
 Leonardo Sbaraglia, actor.

External links

Populated places in Buenos Aires Province
Tres de Febrero Partido